Querido Moheno Tabares (3 December 1873 – 1933) was the Secretary of Foreign Affairs in Mexico from 1913 to 1914.

References

1933 deaths
1873 births
Mexican Secretaries of Foreign Affairs
Mexican diplomats